Van Syckel (also spelled Van Syckle) is an unincorporated community located within Union Township in Hunterdon County, New Jersey. The Van Syckel Corner District was listed on the National Register of Historic Places in 1979.

History
Van Syckel's Tavern, then known as Reynolds Tavern, was built in 1763 by David Reynolds at the intersection of Van Syckels Corner and Norton Roads. It was constructed with stone in Georgian architecture style. Reynolds was later convicted and executed by hanging in Morristown for counterfeiting money on September 17, 1773. In 1795, the tavern was bought by Aaron Van Syckel. The farmhouse of J. Van Syckel next to the tavern was built in 1829 with Greek Revival style.

Historic district

The Van Syckel Corner District is a historic district encompassing the village and extending north to Norton along the border of Union Township with Bethlehem Township. It was added to the National Register of Historic Places on November 8, 1979 for its significance in agriculture, architecture, and commerce. The district includes 18 contributing buildings. The Norton Methodist Episcopal Church was built in 1828, rebuilt in 1855, and renovated in 1881 and 1908.

Gallery

See also 
 National Register of Historic Places listings in Hunterdon County, New Jersey
 List of the oldest buildings in New Jersey

References

External links
 
 

Union Township, Hunterdon County, New Jersey
Unincorporated communities in Hunterdon County, New Jersey
Unincorporated communities in New Jersey
National Register of Historic Places in Hunterdon County, New Jersey
Historic districts on the National Register of Historic Places in New Jersey
New Jersey Register of Historic Places
Georgian architecture in New Jersey
Victorian architecture in New Jersey